Péter Károly Lóránt (born October 23, 1985) is a Hungarian professional basketball player who currently plays for the Atomerőmű SE of the Hungarian National Championship.

Professional career
Lóránt began his career in Hungarian team BC Körmend until 2004, when he signs with Debrecini. In 2005, he leaves the country to play with Sanex Antwerp Giants at Basketball League Belgium.

Básquet Manresa and Ford Burgos

One year later, in 2007, he signs temporarily with Ricoh Manresa at LEB Oro, Spanish second league. After finishing his period at Manresa, Lóránt signs for Ford Burgos where he played during four seasons becoming the captain of the team in the last one. Burgos played in 2010 and 2011 the finals of the promotion playoffs to ACB, but the team failed in both times.

Lagun Aro GBC

In summer 2011, he joins Lagun Aro GBC and plays Liga ACB. The team achieves for the first time the qualification for the Copa del Rey de Baloncesto 2011–12.

Szolnoki Olaj KK

After six years in Spain, in 2012 he leaves Lagun Aro GBC to sign with Italian squad Virtus Roma. In July 2013, Lorant signed with Szolnoki Olaj. On 20 December 2014 he parts ways with Szolnoki Olaj.

Victoria Libertas Pesaro

On January 17, 2015, he signed with Victoria Libertas Pesaro of the Lega Basket Serie A. On June 25, 2015, he parted ways with Pesaro.

Alba Fehérvár

On August 24, 2015, he agrees to 2-year deal with Alba Fehérvár-Puebla Plus of the Hungarian National Championship. After 2 successful year, Peter signed another 2 year deal on April 26, 2017 with Alba.

Atomerőmű SE

On June 26, 2019, he has signed a 2-year contract with Atomerőmű SE of the Hungarian National Championship.

Hungarian national team
Péter Lóránt plays also with the Hungary national basketball team.

References

External links
 ACB Profile
 Spanish Basketball Federation profile
 Eurobasket.com Profile
 FIBA.com Profile

1985 births
Living people
Alba Fehérvár players
Antwerp Giants players
Basketball players from Budapest
Bàsquet Manresa players
BC Körmend players
Gipuzkoa Basket players
Hungarian expatriate basketball people in Belgium
Hungarian expatriate basketball people in Italy
Hungarian expatriate basketball people in Spain
Hungarian men's basketball players
Liga ACB players
Pallacanestro Virtus Roma players
Power forwards (basketball)
Szolnoki Olaj KK players
Victoria Libertas Pallacanestro players